Vempati Sadasivabrahmam shortly Sadasivabrahmam (b: 1905 – d: 1968) was a writer of film stories, dialogues and lyrics in the early period of Telugu cinema.

He was born in Tuni, East Godavari district, Andhra Pradesh. He studied Pancha Kavyas and achieved proficiency in Sanskrit and Telugu languages.

He has debuted with the 1941 film Choodamani directed by Raja Sandow. He wrote the story, dialogues and lyrics for this successful film.

He died on 1 January 1968 in Chennai.

Filmography
 Choodamani (1941) (dialogue) (story)
 Tenali Ramakrishna (1941) (story)
 Gharana Donga (1942) (writer)
 Palnati Yudham (1947) (dialogue)
 Radhika (1947) (director)
Gollabhama (1947) (dialogues) (Lyrics)
 Keelugurram (1949)
 Samsaram (1950) (dialogue) (story)
 Pakka Inti Ammayi (1953)
 Pardesi (1953) (dialogue)
 Kanavane Kan Kanda Daivam (1955) (story)
 Kanyasulkam (1955) (screen adaptation)
 Tenali Ramakrishna (1956/I) (dialogue) (story)
 Bhale Ramudu (1956) (dialogue)
 Charana Daasi (1956) (screen adaptation and dialogue)
 Ondre Kulam (1956) (Story)
 Dampatyam (1957)
 Suvarna Sundari (1957/I) (story)
 Sharada (1957) (story)
 Appu Chesi Pappu Koodu (1958) (adaptation) (dialogue)
 Chenchu Lakshmi (1958/I) (adaptation) (dialogue)
 Illarikam (1959) (dialogue) (story)
 Krishna Leelalu (1959) (adaptation) (dialogue)
 Nagarjuna (1961)
 Pellikani Pillalu (1961)
 Sasural (1961) (story)
 Lava Kusha (1963) (lyrics)
 Prachanda Bhairavi (1965)
 Paramanandayya Shishyula Katha (1966)
 Bhama Vijayam (1967)
 Bhuvana Sundari Katha (1967)
 Nene Monaganni (1968)
 Ranabheri'' (1968)

References

External links
 
 Article by Raavi Kondala Rao in పాత బంగారం series

Indian lyricists
1905 births
1968 deaths
Poets from Andhra Pradesh
Screenwriters from Andhra Pradesh
20th-century Indian poets
People from East Godavari district
20th-century Indian dramatists and playwrights
Telugu screenwriters
Telugu-language lyricists
20th-century Indian screenwriters